"Somewhere Only We Know" is a song composed and performed by English alternative rock band Keane, officially released as the first single from their debut album, Hopes and Fears (2004). The single peaked at number three on the UK Singles Chart during its first week of sales.

In 2013, the song was covered by Lily Allen for a John Lewis Christmas advert; Allen's version reached number-one in the UK Singles Chart.

Composition and recording
The first demo was composed by Tim Rice-Oxley in about 2001. Rice-Oxley said that the song came from "hammering away on the piano" explaining "I was thinking of something like David Bowie's "Heroes", which you drive along to a really rocking beat...It was one of the first things we recorded for the album." It was first played on the guitar just before Dominic Scott left the band, and recorded as a demo the same year with a Yamaha CP70 instead of the guitar. Keane recorded the final version in 2003 at the Helioscentric Studios, Rye, East Sussex for the album. Keane also played this song at the historic concert Live 8 in London, along with the single "Bedshaped".

A demo version of "Somewhere Only We Know" was leaked into the Internet in 2004. This version features a different length (4:24) and an extra bridge. Chaplin's shouts near the outro of the final version do not feature in the demo.

"Somewhere Only We Know" is a traditional piano rock song. The piano is the most relevant instrument due to its harmonic and rhythmic role. It is played in quavers throughout the whole song, holding the tempo and the rhythmic pattern. The studio version is recorded in 87bpm, and follows a 4/4 time signature, the most commonly used in traditional rock songs. It is in the key of A major. The song form can be analyzed as ABAB CBCB, a variation of the strophic form. The verse (A) chord progression is a plain (I-II-V), one of the most used chord progressions in music; the chorus (B) presents a (VI-III-IV-V) progression; the variation of the verse section (C) presents a (II-III-IV-V) progression.

The bass line was recorded by Rice-Oxley. When played live (up until 2007 with the arrival of bassist Jesse Quin), this song uses a pre-recorded bass, which is played in an Apple PowerBook G4. The 16-beat rhythm was made by Hughes.

History
The song was mixed by Mark "Spike" Stent. 3" pocket CDs were released as a limited edition of 1000, containing the B-side "Snowed Under" as well as links to receive a polyphonic ringtone via SMS. These copies are now valued at £20 due to their rarity. This song was the first Keane item released on vinyl format. The records were numbered and limited to 5,000 copies, only sold in the United Kingdom. The B-side "Walnut Tree" was recorded during the James Sanger sessions at Normandy, France.

The song's lyrics refer to Manser's Shaw, a place in Battle that Keane members used to visit in their childhood days and the site of the Battle of Hastings, fought on 14 October 1066. According to Rice-Oxley, they wrote the song after returning to Battle from London after failing to achieve musical success. The "pathway" referenced in the song refers to the trail between the house of Rice-Oxley's parents and the local pub.  

Richard Hughes, Keane's drummer, offered the following explanation of the song on Chris Flynn's fansite:

B-sides
 Snowed Under
The song talks about a place called "Manser's Shaw" in Battle, East Sussex where the band used to spend their childhood days. It was inspired by a poem.
"Snowed Under" was the only B-side played live during 2004, 2005, and early 2006, because of its appearance on the CD+DVD version of Hopes and Fears, as well as in the Japanese version of it. Like "Walnut Tree", this song was mixed by Andy Green. "Snowed Under" also titles the band's debut album, with the line "someone who understands your hopes and fears".
 Walnut Tree
The lyrics talk about waiting for someone under a walnut tree, but Rice-Oxley hasn't given this meaning. It appeared on the Music from the OC: Mix 2 soundtrack. James Sanger is credited on this song for his contributions at his studios in France. This song was mixed by Andy Green.

Music videos
There are three music videos for this song:
 UK version
Keane appear coming out of a studio and taking a taxi. Then they come across a forest where the "simple thing" aliens live (called Roxleys by some fans). Each Roxley represents the spirit of a tree.

This international video was directed by Corin Hardy, produced by Kit Hawkins for White House Pictures, and shot between 22 and 23 November 2003. Hardy was influenced by the movie Princess Mononoke and created the "simple thing" aliens based on the "Kodama" appearing in that film.

The video saga starts with an image of a backstage door shortly before Keane walk through it with Tom holding a snare. They get into a British taxi cab. A little spirit (a "simple thing" alien) is inside the taxi. Then they arrive in a wooded area (in East Sussex, owned by Anthony Becvar, an acquaintance of Corin Hardy). The "simple thing" alien remains in the cab. They began walking through the forest, "an empty land", across a "fallen tree" and finally arrive at a stream. They are now playing the song in the stream. Near the end of the song, the little spirits, Roxleys, appear again and get closer to Keane. Finally, lights representing their hearts shine.

 United States version 1
The video is the same without the "simple thing" aliens.

 United States version 2 and other countries
This video was shot on 29 May 2004 in Hollywood, California, and directed by The Saline Project. The song kicks off and Keane are playing a gig on the stage with a photograph of a forest behind them. Soon, the photograph becomes real, and Keane are playing in the forest it represents. After the chorus, the forest becomes a city, and buildings start to grow. In the last chorus, it starts raining before converting into a forest again. The forest disappears, and then Keane are playing again on the stage.

Cover art
The cover art, designed by Madefire and Alex Lake, represents maple leaves falling, as on the music video. It also relates to the themes of the B-sides, "Walnut Tree" and "Snowed Under". Although neither of these songs appear on the Hopes and Fears album, they are relatively well known due to live performances and soundtracks. The letters reading "KEANE" are also in the background, featuring the red leaves.

Track listings
Enhanced CD single
Catalogue number: CID849The CD included two different wallpapers for the PC and the official UK release music video.
 "Somewhere Only We Know" – 3:58
 "Snowed Under" – 3:51
 "Walnut Tree" – 3:40
 "Somewhere Only We Know" (CD-ROM video) – 3:56UK 7-inch vinylCatalogue number: IS849
 "Somewhere Only We Know"
 "Snowed Under"UK 3-inch pocket CDReleased 19 July 2004. It included links for download polyphonic and real ringtones.
 "Somewhere Only We Know"
 "Snowed Under"

Alternative versionsGerman enhanced CD singleReleased 26 March 2004.
 "Somewhere Only We Know"
 "Snowed Under"Spanish enhanced CD single'Released 16 April 2004.
 "Somewhere Only We Know"
 "Walnut Tree"
 "Somewhere Only We Know" (video)

Charts

Weekly charts

Year-end charts

Certifications
 

Release history

Lily Allen version

In 2013, English singer Lily Allen released a cover version of the song. It was released on 10 November 2013 in the United Kingdom as a digital download through Parlophone and Regal Recordings. The song was selected as the soundtrack to the John Lewis 2013 Christmas advertisement. The song reached number one in the UK Singles Chart, becoming her third number-one single. "Somewhere Only We Know" is included on Allen's third studio album, Sheezus.

A portion of the proceeds from the sales of the single were donated to Save the Children's Philippine Typhoon Appeal campaign.

Allen's version of the song was used for the trailer of The Little Prince (2015), which was shown in French.

Allen's version of the song was also used on an advertisement by Brazilian telecommunications company Vivo in 2015.

The Labour Party used this version in a campaign video for the 2017 general election.

Music video
The video for the song is a composite made by editor Chris Morris of the John Lewis "The Bear and the Hare" Christmas advert, directed by Elliot Dear and Yves Geleyn, and its making-of video, directed by Jake & Josh (Jacob Hopewell & Josh Hine), allowing the song to run to its full length.

Commercial performance
On 24 November 2013, "Somewhere Only We Know" reached number one in the UK Singles Chart, thus becoming Allen's third number-one single following "Smile" (2006) and "The Fear" (2009). Although the song spent a total of three non-consecutive weeks at the top spot, it did not reach number one on the UK Singles Downloads Chart. It sold 46,279 copies during its second week at number one, the lowest number for a number-one single since Taio Cruz's "Break Your Heart" sold 42,746 copies in its third week at number one in 2009.

In total the single sold over 600,000 copies. According to the BPI, the single was awarded a gold disc in January 2014, representing 400,000 sales. The song was included on the album Now 86!'' which sold more than 1.1 million copies to become the UK's best-selling album of 2013.

Track listing

Credits and personnel
Credits adapted from CD single liner notes.

Tom Chaplin – songwriter
Richard Hughes – songwriter
Tim Rice-Oxley – songwriter
Lily Allen – lead vocals
Paul Beard – producer, arranger, mixer, piano, percussion, programming
Paul Sayer – acoustic guitar
James Banbury – string arrangement
Joe Kearns – engineer and mixer
Andy Cook – assistant
Will Hicks – assistant 
Matt Dougthy – assistant
Jason Elliot – additional programming
Stuart Hawkes – mastering

Charts

Weekly charts

Year-end charts

Certifications

Release history

References

External links
 Official site
 Keaneshaped - Information about record
 Keane.fr - Information about the record in French

2004 singles
2004 songs
Interscope Records singles
Irish Singles Chart number-one singles
Island Records singles
Keane (band) songs
Lily Allen songs
Parlophone singles
Rock ballads
Songs written by Richard Hughes (musician)
Songs written by Tim Rice-Oxley
Songs written by Tom Chaplin
UK Singles Chart number-one singles